Bunia Airport  is an airport serving Bunia the capital of Ituri province, Democratic Republic of the Congo.

The Bunia VOR/DME (Ident: BUN) and Bunia non-directional beacon (Ident: BUN) are located on the field.

Airlines and destinations

See also
 Transport in the Democratic Republic of the Congo
 List of airports in the Democratic Republic of the Congo

References

External links
 
 OpenStreetMap - Bunia Airport

Airports in Ituri